Fanny Augusta Ahlfors (March 21, 1884 – January 13, 1947) was a Finnish Social Democratic politician. She was a member of the Parliament of Finland between 1919–27 and 1930–33 from the constituency of Turku Province North. Ahlfors was also a member of the electoral college for selecting the President of Finland in 1925 and 1931. She was born and died in Pori.

References

1884 births
1947 deaths
People from Pori
People from Turku and Pori Province (Grand Duchy of Finland)
Social Democratic Party of Finland politicians
Members of the Parliament of Finland (1919–22)
Members of the Parliament of Finland (1922–24)
Members of the Parliament of Finland (1924–27)
Members of the Parliament of Finland (1930–33)